Death's Domain is a book by Terry Pratchett and Stephen Briggs, and illustrated by Paul Kidby.  It is the fourth in the Discworld Mapp series, other publications of which include The Streets of Ankh-Morpork, The Discworld Mapp and A Tourist Guide to Lancre.  It was first published in paperback by Corgi in 1999. It was the second in the series to be illustrated by Kidby. As with the other "mapps", the basic design and booklet were compiled by Pratchett and Briggs.

The Mapp shows the parasite universe of Death's Domain. The accompanying booklet provides various details of the Domain, both as portrayed in the Discworld books and newly revealed.

In Death's Domain, the concept of steam locomotives on Discworld is introduced, which became the main theme of Pratchett's Discworld novel Raising Steam fourteen years later.

In the live-action adaptations of Hogfather and The Colour of Magic, Dorney Court is the real-life location used for the exterior of Mon Repos, Death's house.

References

External links
 Death's Domain, In Discworld Wiki
 Death's Domain (Discworld Mapp), In Discworld Wiki
 

Discworld books
Fictional atlases
Fictional maps
Discworld locations